The Sonata for Solo Violin in D major, Opus 115, is a three-movement work for unaccompanied violin composed by Sergei Prokofiev in 1947. It was commissioned by the Soviet Union's Committee of Arts Affairs as a pedagogical work for talented violin students. It is therefore a non-virtuosic piece, and was originally designed to be played not by one soloist but by multiple young performers in unison. It was not performed until 10 July 1959 - six years after Prokofiev's death - by Ruggiero Ricci at the Moscow Conservatory.

Structure and Analysis

The three movements of the sonata are as follows:
Moderato
Andante dolce. Tema con variazioni 
Con brio. Allegro precipitato

The work is composed in Classical style and its melodies are largely diatonic. The first movement is in sonata form, the second movement is a theme with five variations, and the third movement has characteristics of a mazurka.

References

External links

Compositions by Sergei Prokofiev
1947 compositions
Compositions in D major
Solo violin pieces